Asphalt is a 1929 German silent film directed by Joe May. The film stars Gustav Fröhlich and Betty Amann and is about a young woman in Berlin who is driven into poverty and steals a valuable piece of jewelry. She is caught by a police officer which leads to the woman to  attempt to seduce him into letting her go. The film was shot between October and December 1928 at  UFA.

Plot
In Berlin, a young woman named Else is a gorgeous trickster. Her high fashion clothes and perfectly ornamented makeup make her deserving to be peering over diamond cases while batting her eyes in want at the jeweler. She is caught lying and after professing it was the first time, that she needed the money. Even when she meets Albert. she insists her luxurious apartment and belongings are not hers. She maintains her story until she flings herself into his arms and confesses to him, "I like you."

Else thinks about Albert and as she smiles for the first time when she finds the passport photo of Albert in her apartment. Gazing at the photo she smiles comparing him to her criminal, older, and uglier boyfriend in a photo beside her. She stares and smiles at his picture again in the nightclub, when she becomes compelled to return his passport and give him a gift of cigars, a scene that results in a confession of love from both Else and Albert.

Albert is then at Else's feet, begging her to be his wife, that she can no longer stand the differences between them. He looks up at her in her white elegant dress and she runs away. She breaks away and exposes all her stolen goods from her criminal past. As he considers his fate, her criminal boyfriend enters the scene and a brawl ensues. The boyfriend is killed accidentally, and after struggling with his decision, Albert leaves the scene. In confession to his parents, Albert's father deems that the law is the law, and he must turn himself in. When Else discovers he has done so, she knows what she must do. Else voluntarily turns herself into the police. Elsie is able to smile once again as Albert follows her and professes he will wait for her. Albert watches Else through a barred doorway as she goes off to jail.

Cast

Production
Asphalt was made by UFA, one of Germany's most prestigious film studios. It was shot between October and December 1928 at the Ufa Studios in Neubabelsberg.

Release
Asphalt was distributed theatrically by UFA-Filmverleih GmbH and premiered in Berlin at the Ufa-Palast am Zoo on 11 March 1929. Asphalt  was originally only available in a shortened version with English-language intertitles. In 1993,  the Stiftung Deutsche Kinemathek in Berlin discovered a print of Asphalt at the Gosfilmofond archive in Moscow which seemed to have been sourced from the original film negative. The chronology of scenes in print found differed from earlier versions and included extra scenes with German intertitles. The newly discovered version of the film was released on DVD by the Masters of Cinema on April 11, 2005 with a score by Karl-Ernst Sasse. Kino Video released the film on DVD again on July 18, 2006.

Reception
Fritz Walter, writing in the Berliner Börsen-Courier found the films theme of the conflict between duty and love to be "the banality of the film script". Lotte Eisner related to this statement, writing in 1965 that "Within this insipid plot Joe May occasionally remembers his artistic ambitions. Then we get the high-angle shot of the street where the young Fröhlich, the Führer of the crossroads, on duty as a policeman, dominates the traffic—a shot in which the German taste for ordered ornamentation comes through yet again"  Critic Siegfried Kracauers's review in Frankfurter Zeitung conversely commented that May "has all the finesse of his craft, he accomplishes all that he wants to. There are few prose writers that can convey the posh couple’s taxi ride as tightly as he does. Similarly, the wide shots are used and sustained with enormous strength of style, and the roaming camera is extremely skilled in the way it reveals human co-existence and spaces"

References

Sources

External links

 Asphalt at Rotten Tomatoes
 Bibliography
 

1929 films
1929 drama films
German silent feature films
German drama films
German Expressionist films
Films of the Weimar Republic
German black-and-white films
Films set in Germany
Films set in Berlin
Films directed by Joe May
Films produced by Erich Pommer
Films with screenplays by Joe May
Films with screenplays by Hans Székely
UFA GmbH films
Silent drama films
1920s German films